The New QEII Hospital is located in Welwyn Garden City and managed by East and North Hertfordshire NHS Trust.

History

The hospital was commissioned in 2013 by the East and North Hertfordshire NHS Trust, at a cost of £30 million.  It was designed by the architects Penoyre & Prasad. It was officially opened by Alistair Burt, the Minister for Community and Social Care at the time, and Simon Stevens, the Chief Executive of NHS England on 6 November 2015.

The hospital replaced the Queen Elizabeth II Hospital.  This hospital was opened by the Queen in July 1963, replacing the Welwyn Garden City Cottage Hospital in Church Road. All inpatient and emergency services were transferred to the Lister Hospital at Stevenage in October 2014.

The old hospital was demolished and that part of the site was subsequently developed by Bellway in 2017.

Services
The hospital provides GP services, outpatient clinics, diagnostic (radiology, pathology and endoscopy), a breast unit and antenatal and postnatal care, as well as an urgent care centre.

See also
Enhance Herts

References

External links
 Official site
 NHS information page

Hospitals in Hertfordshire
NHS hospitals in England
Welwyn Garden City